Cochin Stock Exchange (CSE or CoSE) was an Indian stock exchange in Kochi, Kerala fully owned by Government of India. It was incorporated in 1978. At its peak, it had almost 500 Indian companies listed, and with a daily turnover of 70–, it was the fourth largest exchange in India.

Cochin Stock Brokers, which provides trading facilities on the Bombay Stock Exchange, and CSE Institute, an educational organisation, continue to operate beyond the closure of the exchange.

History 
Cochin Stock Exchange was established in 1978.

During the 1990s, it was the fourth largest exchange in India by turnover, with a daily turnover of 70–, with 476 Indian companies listed.

Computerized trading was introduced in 1997. The major back office system software used are NESS and BOSS respectively for NSE and BSE. The trading software used in CSBL was Multex, developed by CMC. Traders are provided  Meta Stock and ERS software, trading terminals and optical fiber connections. DP holdings are maintained by demat services like CDSL.

The new millennium saw the stock exchange building being shifted from the old structure to a brand new building in the Kaloor area in northern Kochi.

Trading hours historically used to begin late in the afternoon enabling access to traders from other regions of the state. Base Minimum Capital required to be maintained is Rs. 2 lakhs.

The securities scam of the early nineties led the Securities and Exchange Board of India (SEBI) regulations on stock exchanges requires separation of ownership and trading rights and made it mandatory for majority ownership rests with the public, those without any trading rights.

It was in the final stages of closure by May 2014.

Economic impact
Industrialisation did not happen in Kerala to the extent as in other Indian states. The reasons for the failure to attract manufacturing industries was due to the political climate and the lack of resources in a small state with such a large population density. The stock exchange served as a channel for investors to find investment opportunities.

Related organisations
Cochin Stock Brokers Limited (CSBL) previously  wholly owned by Government of India  , is a corporate member of the National Stock Exchange of India and the Bombay Stock Exchange, enabling CSBL users to have trading facilities in these listings.

CSE Institute is an organisation that provides stock market training for investors.

See also 
 List of South Asian stock exchanges
 List of stock exchanges in the Commonwealth of Nations

References

External links
 Official Site of the Cochin Stock Exchange

Economy of Kochi
Former stock exchanges in India
1978 establishments in Kerala
Financial services companies based in Kochi
Indian companies established in 1978